Empress Xia (夏皇后) may refer to:

Empress Dowager Xia ( 527–557), empress dowager of the Liang dynasty
Empress Xia (Song dynasty) (died 1167), wife of Emperor Xiaozong of Song
Empress Xia (Ming dynasty) (1492–1535), wife of Zhengde Emperor of the Ming dynasty

Xia